Smith-Cotton High School is a public high school in Sedalia, Missouri, in the United States. The school serves students in grades 9–12 in the Sedalia 200 School District. The current principal is Wade Norton. Athletic teams are known as the Tigers, and the school colors are black and gold.

History 
SCHS was named after Sarah Smith Cotton, a prominent member of the early Sedalia community. The land on which one of her previous houses stood was used for the original building. The first year of consolidated grade 9-12 education at SCHS was the 1925-1926 school year. An approved 1946 referendum brought a gymnasium/cafeteria and additional classrooms.

Athletics 
Smith-Cotton features a variety of sports, featuring Football, Basketball, Baseball, Softball, Volleyball, and Track. Smith-Cotton formerly competed in the West Central Conference but later was a founding member in the Central Missouri Activities Conference.

Extracurricular activities
Smith-Cotton has a competitive FIRST Robotics Competition team,  "Team SCREAM".

The school also has a Junior Reserve Officer Training Corps (JROTC), known as Tiger Battalion.

Performing arts
SCHS has a competitive dance team, "High Voltage".

Smith-Cotton has a competitive marching band, "Tiger Pride", and hosts an annual competition, the Smith-Cotton Marching Invitational.

The school has two competitive show choirs, the varsity-level "New Score Singers" and the jayvee-level group "Vocal Velocity". Smith-Cotton also previously had an all-female group, "Cabaret". New Score Singers won national-level competitions in 1996 and 1997. The program also hosts an annual competition, the Show Me Classic.

Notable alumni 
Kim Anderson, basketball player
Bud Thomas, baseball player
Leroy Van Dyke, country singer

References

External links

Public high schools in Missouri
Schools in Pettis County, Missouri
Educational institutions established in 1925
1925 establishments in Missouri
Sedalia, Missouri